Gərəkli is a village and municipality in the Balakan Rayon of Azerbaijan. It has a population of 3,617.  The municipality includes the villages of Gərəkli and Mazımçay.

References

Populated places in Balakan District